Asiye Nur Fettahoğlu (born 12 November 1980) is a Turkish-German actress, model, television presenter and fashion designer known for playing numerous characters in several films and television series, including her role as Mahidevran Sultan in Muhteşem Yüzyıl.

Early life
Fettahoğlu was born in 1980 to Fatma and Sinan Fettahoğlu as one of their five children in Duisburg, West Germany. Her family is from Rize, Turkey. After Ottoman Empire collapsed, Her paternal family is of Turkish descent and immigrated from Cretan. During Yugoslavia, Her maternal family is Kosovo Albanian, they later migrated to Rize. Her education was at Beşiktaş High School and then she went to Haliç University and graduated with a degree in fashion design. She worked for a while as a television anchor for financial news on the Sky Türk channel.

Personal life
Between 2008 and 2011, Fettahoğlu was married to Murat Aysan. In 2013, she married businessman Levent Veziroğlu. The couple separated in 2015 but reconciled before the divorce proceedings were finalized. On 14 February 2016, Fettahoğlu gave birth to their daughter. The couple formally divorced in March 2021.

Filmography

Awards and nominations

References

External links
 
 
Nur Fettahoğlu at Sinematurk

Social media 
Nur Fettahoğlu at Instagram
Nur Fettahoğlu at Facebook

1980 births
Living people
Turkish film actresses
People from Duisburg
German people of Turkish descent
German people of Albanian descent
German people of Kosovan descent
Turkish people of Albanian descent
Turkish people of Kosovan descent
German film actresses
Turkish television actresses
German television actresses